This list is of the Historic Sites of Japan located within the Prefecture of Niigata.

National Historic Sites
As of 1 January 2021, thirty-three Sites have been designated as being of national significance.

|-
|}

Prefectural Historic Sites
As of 1 May 2020, forty-six Sites have been designated as being of prefectural importance.

Municipal Historic Sites
As of 1 May 2020, a further two hundred and eighty-six Sites have been designated as being of municipal importance.

See also

 Cultural Properties of Japan
 Echigo Province
 Sado Province
 Niigata Prefectural Museum of History
 List of Places of Scenic Beauty of Japan (Niigata)
 List of Cultural Properties of Japan - paintings (Niigata)

References

External links
  Cultural Properties in Niigata Prefecture

Niigata Prefecture
 Niigata